Tillemann is a patronymic surname of German origin from the personal name Til. Notable people with the surname include:

 Charity Sunshine Tillemann-Dick (1983–2019), American soprano and presenter
 Johann Martin Tillemann, co-owner of the merchant bank Seyler & Tillemann
 Levi Tillemann (born 1981), American businessman, academic, and author

See also 
 
 Tilleman
 Tillemans

References 

German-language surnames
Patronymic surnames